Rizi, as a last name in Iranian usage, refers to people etc., related to Riz (Zarrin shahr), a town near Isfahan. It is also a surname in other nations.

People
Marco Rizi (born 1986), Canadian soccer player
Juan Rizi (1600–1681), Spanish painter
Francisco Rizi (1614–1685), Spanish painter